James Torrance (28 July 1889 – 2 July 1949) was a Scottish footballer and football manager. He played as a utility forward for Fulham for sixteen years, and also spent two seasons at Walsall, including one season as manager.

Career
Joining Fulham from Ashfield in 1910, he spent 16 years at the club, making a total of 355 league appearances, scoring 35 goals. A utility forward, he played in four different attacking positions for the "Cottagers". For almost the entirety of his time at Craven Cottage, the club were in the Second Division and led by Phil Kelso. Andy Ducat was in charge from 1924 to 1926.

He moved to Walsall in July 1926, and replaced David Ashworth as manager for the 1927–28 campaign. He masterminded a 7–0 win over Coventry City in the Third Division South, and signed David Fairhurst and Moses Lane. Torrance played forty league and cup games for "Saddlers", but the club only avoided applying for re-election by two points, and he left Fellows Park at the end of the season.

Personal life 
Torrance worked as a ships' boilermaker in Scotland during the First World War. He later worked for a telephone company and died of cancer in July 1949.

References

1889 births
1949 deaths
Footballers from Coatbridge
Scottish footballers
Association football forwards
Ashfield F.C. players
Fulham F.C. players
Walsall F.C. players
Scottish Junior Football Association players
English Football League players
Walsall F.C. managers
English Football League managers
Deaths from cancer
Scottish football managers